Republic County (standard abbreviation: RP) is a county located in the state of Kansas, south from the Nebraska state line. As of the 2020 census, the county population was 4,674. The largest city, and the county seat, is Belleville.

History

Early history

For millennia, the Great Plains of North America were inhabited by nomadic Native Americans.  From the 16th to 18th centuries, the Kingdom of France claimed ownership of large parts of North America.  In 1762, after the French and Indian War, France ceded New France to Spain, by the Treaty of Fontainebleau.

19th century
In 1802, Spain returned most of the land to France, keeping title to about 7,500 square miles.  In 1803, the land that included modern day Kansas was acquired by the United States from France as part of the 828,000 square mile Louisiana Purchase.

Prior to the arrival of settlers of European ancestry, the area was inhabited by Indian tribes including the Pawnee, Iowa, and Otoe. One should also consider that other nomadic Indian tribes pursuing the buffalo, including the Arapaho, Cheyenne, Comanche, Kansa, Kiowa, Osage, and Wichita, may have made the area their home at one time or another.

In 1854, under the provisions of the Kansas–Nebraska Act, the Kansas Territory was organized. In 1860, Republic County was established by the Kansas legislature. And, in 1861, Kansas became the 34th U.S. state. The county is named for the Republican River, which enters at the northwestern corner of the county, flowing slightly east of south, and leaving the county about eight miles east of the southwest corner.

Daniel and Conrad Myers were the first settlers of European ancestry, arriving in February 1861. By 1868, Republic County was holding elections. Daniel Myers was elected judge of the Probate court and Conrad Myers to a seat on the County commission. At the election in 1869, the permanent location of the county seat was voted on with the following result: Belleville 59 and New Scandinavia 42, with a couple of votes going to other locations.

Following the Civil War and during the latter half of the 19th century, Belleville and the surrounding area became a destination for European immigrants, notably from Sweden and Bohemia (now Czech Republic).

In 1887, Atchison, Topeka and Santa Fe Railway built a branch line from Neva (3 miles west of Strong City) to Superior, Nebraska.  This branch line connected Strong City, Neva, Rockland, Diamond Springs, Burdick, Lost Springs, Jacobs, Hope, Navarre, Enterprise, Abilene, Talmage, Manchester, Longford, Oak Hill, Miltonvale, Aurora, Huscher, Concordia, Kackley, Courtland, Webber, Superior.  At some point, the line from Neva to Lost Springs was pulled but the right of way has not been abandoned.  This branch line was originally called "Strong City and Superior line" but later the name was shortened to the "Strong City line".

In 1996, the Atchison, Topeka and Santa Fe Railway merged with Burlington Northern Railroad and was renamed the BNSF Railway, although most locals still refer to this railroad as the "Santa Fe".

Geography

Adjacent counties
 Thayer County, Nebraska (north)
 Jefferson County, Nebraska (northeast)
 Washington County (east)
 Cloud County (south)
 Jewell County (west)
 Nuckolls County, Nebraska (northwest)

Demographics

As of the census of 2000, there were 5,835 people, 2,557 households, and 1,685 families residing in the county. The population density was 8 people per square mile (3/km2). There were 3,113 housing units at an average density of 4 per square mile (2/km2). The racial makeup of the county was 98.56% White, 0.26% Black or African American, 0.21% Native American, 0.19% Asian, 0.33% from other races, and 0.46% from two or more races.  0.94% of the population were Hispanic or Latino of any race. 24.1% were of German, 13.6% Swedish, 12.4% Czech, 9.2% English, 9.0% Irish and 8.6% American ancestry according to Census 2000.

There were 2,557 households, out of which 25.60% had children under the age of 18 living with them, 58.80% were married couples living together, 4.80% had a woman householder with no husband present, and 34.10% were non-families. 31.80% of all households were made up of individuals, and 18.00% had someone living alone who was 65 years of age or older.  The average household size was 2.23 and the average family size was 2.80.

In the county, the population was spread out, with 22.30% under the age of 18, 4.50% from 18 to 24, 22.10% from 25 to 44, 25.00% from 45 to 64, and 26.10% who were 65 years of age or older.  The median age was 46 years. For every 100 women there were 93.20 men.  For every 100 women age 18 and over, there were 90.80 men.

The median income for a household in the county was $30,494, and the median income for a family was $39,215. Men had a median income of $25,260 versus $17,274 for women. The per capita income for the county was $17,433.  About 6.00% of families and 9.10% of the population were below the poverty line, including 12.40% of those under age 18 and 8.90% of those age 65 or over.

Government

Presidential elections

Republic County is overwhelmingly Republican. No Democratic presidential candidate has won the county, with the exception of Franklin D. Roosevelt in 1932 and Woodrow Wilson in 1912 and 1916. Since 1996, the Republican candidate has garnered seventy percent of the county's vote. The only Democrat since 1980 to exceed one quarter of the vote was Michael Dukakis in 1988.

Laws
Republic County was a prohibition ("dry") county until 1986, when the Kansas Constitution was amended, allowing the sale of alcoholic liquor by the individual drink with a 30 percent food sales requirement.

Education

Unified school districts
 Republic County USD 109
 Pike Valley USD 426

Communities

Cities

 Agenda
 Belleville
 Courtland
 Cuba
 Munden
 Narka
 Republic
 Scandia

Unincorporated communities
† means a Census-Designated Place (CDP) by the United States Census Bureau.

 Harbine
 Kackley
 Norway†
 Rydal
 Talmo
 Wayne

Ghost town
 Sherdahl
 White Rock

Townships
Republic County is divided into twenty townships.  The city of Belleville is considered governmentally independent and is excluded from the census figures for the townships.  In the following table, the population center is the largest city (or cities) included in that township's population total, if it is of a significant size.

Notable people

Arts and entertainment
 Robert Gordon, actor (1895–1971)
 Greta Granstedt, actress
 Harry A. Pollard, silent film actor

Athletes
 Herb Bradley, Major League Baseball player
 Thomas Bushby, player for the Cincinnati "Football" Reds in 1934 and the Philadelphia Eagles in 1935
 Lloyd Cardwell, football player
 Larry Cheney, Major League Baseball player
 Dean Nesmith, professional football player, Olympic athletic trainer
 Ronald Severa, Olympic water polo player, 1956 and 1960
 Anthony Zuzzio, offensive lineman for the Detroit Lions

Clergy
 Allen Wikgren, pastor and Bible scholar
 Richard B. Wilke, former pastor in Scandia, writer of the Disciple ministry series

Journalists
 J. C. Humphrey, founder of the Belleville Telescope newspaper

Medicine
 C. M. Arbuthnot, early physician and pharmacist in the county

Philanthropy
 Elizabeth A. Johnson, Kansas history advocate

Politicians
 Clay Aurand, member of Kansas Legislature
 Charles H. Blosser (1895–1989), namesake of Blosser Municipal Airport in Concordia, Kansas
 Edwin C. Johnson, Governor of Colorado
 William C. Perry, 34th Chief Justice of the Oregon Supreme Court
 Isaac O. Savage, state senator in the Kansas legislature

Settlers
 Ransom Henry Gile, early settler in Scandia
 Thomas Lovewell, founded settlement of White Rock, namesake of Lovewell Reservoir

See also
 National Register of Historic Places listings in Republic County, Kansas

References

Further reading

 A History of Republic County, Kansas; I.O. Savage; Jones & Chubbic; 323 pages; 1901.
 Standard Atlas of Republic County, Kansas; Geo. A. Ogle & Co; 66 pages; 1923.
 Standard Atlas of Republic County, Kansas; Geo. A. Ogle & Co; 58 pages; 1904.
 Atlas of Republic County, Kansas; Gillen & Davy; 47 pages; 1884.

External links

County
 
 Republic County - directory of public officials
Other
 Republic County Historical Society Museum
Maps
 Republic County maps: current, historic, KDOT
 Kansas highway maps: current, historic, KDOT
 Kansas railroad maps: current, 1996, 1915, KDOT and Kansas Historical Society

 
Kansas counties
1860 establishments in Kansas Territory